High Barnet is a London Underground station, and former railway station, located in Chipping Barnet, North London. The station is the northern terminus of the High Barnet branch of the Northern line and is in Travelcard Zone 5. It is situated 10.2 miles (16.4 km) north north-west of Charing Cross. The next station south is Totteridge & Whetstone.

Services

Northern line trains are scheduled to arrive and depart every 3–9 minutes from the station's three southbound platforms, with trains operating to Morden via Bank or to Kennington, Battersea Power Station or Morden via Charing Cross.

On days when Night Tube service is not running, between about 00:00 and 01:00, departing trains run as far as East Finchley only, from where journeys to central London can be continued by night bus N20, which also serves High Barnet station itself.

When trains are no longer required to run on the Northern line, they may be stabled on the sidings to the east of the station.

Connections
London Buses routes 34, 107, 184, 234, 263, 307, 326, 383, 384, 389, school routes 606, 626, 634 and night route N20 serve the station.

History

High Barnet station was planned by the Edgware, Highgate and London Railway (EH&LR) and was originally opened on 1 April 1872 by the Great Northern Railway (which had taken over the EH&LR) on the original site of the Barnet Faire. It was the terminus of the branch of a line that ran from Finsbury Park to Edgware via Highgate.

After the 1921 Railways Act created the "Big Four" railway companies the line was, from 1923, part of the London & North Eastern Railway (LNER). The section of the High Barnet branch north of East Finchley was incorporated into the London Underground network through the "Northern Heights" project begun in the late 1930s. High Barnet station was first served by Northern line trains on 14 April 1940 and, after a period where the station was served by both operators, LNER services ended in 1941. British Rail (the successor to the LNER) freight trains continued to serve the station's goods yard until 1 October 1962, when it was closed.

The station still retains much of its original Victorian architectural character today, with numerous platform buildings dating from the pre-London Transport era.

In 2008, a new train crew accommodation block was constructed immediately to the south west of the station on part of the car park. This was opened on 31 January 2010.

Also, further improvements have been introduced: A new covered step-free entrance from the car park to platform one is now available, along with a ramp at the end of the platform connecting it to platforms two and three. There are also two accessible toilets now available. These works were fully completed in October 2009. Therefore, there is full step-free access coverage in the station, although a considerably steep path to the station still exists if approaching from the north and a steep approach from the road to station level from the south also remains.

See also
Northern Line Embankment, High Barnet

References

External links

 High Barnet Station in 1935 during the LNER period prior to London Transport's take-over.

Northern line stations
Tube stations in the London Borough of Barnet
Railway stations in Great Britain opened in 1872
Former Great Northern Railway stations
Chipping Barnet
London Underground Night Tube stations